Psilogramma ulrichroesleri is a moth of the  family Sphingidae. It is known from Papua New Guinea.

References

Psilogramma
Moths described in 2004
Endemic fauna of Papua New Guinea